Tom Villiam Blohm (29 June 1920 – 30 December 2000) was a Norwegian football player. He was born in Kristiania, and played for the sports club SFK Lyn. He played for the Norwegian national team at the 1952 Summer Olympics in Helsinki. He was capped 20 times for Norway between 1939 and 1952.

References

External links

1920 births
2000 deaths
Footballers from Oslo
Norwegian footballers
Norway international footballers
Lyn Fotball players
Footballers at the 1952 Summer Olympics
Olympic footballers of Norway
Association football goalkeepers